The Dhaka–Chittagong high-speed railway is a proposed high-speed rail line connecting Dhaka, the capital and largest city, with the southeast harbour city of Chittagong. The project is estimated to cost ৳96,752 crore (US$11.4 billion).

The travel time between Dhaka and Chittagong will be 73 minutes for trains stopping at intermediate stations, and 55 minutes for nonstop trains. The ticket cost for one-way journey will be ৳2,000 without any discount or concession, more than three times higher than a conventional seat on current inter-city trains.

History 
On May 31, 2018, Bangladesh Railway signed an agreement with the China Railway Design Corporation and Mazumder Enterprise. This contract is designed to verify the design and feasibility of proposed high-speed train lines. According to this agreement, feasibility and design work will be completed in December 2019 at a cost of Tk102.10 crore. The government of Bangladesh is bearing this cost.

It is expected to reduce travel time to between 55 and 73 minutes between Dhaka and Chittagong while current inter-city trains has to spent around six hours of travel time are needed to cover the distance by the current  metre-gauge railways. The new route will be , making the route  shorter.

 of land will be needed to be acquired.

See also 
Dhaka-Chittagong Elevated Expressway
List of megaprojects in Bangladesh

References

External links

Railway lines in Bangladesh
Proposed railway lines in Asia